The Summary Jurisdiction Act 1884 (47 & 48 Vict c 43) was an Act of the Parliament of the United Kingdom. Courtney Ilbert described this Act as an "expurgatory Act".

The whole Act was repealed by section 132(1) of, and Schedule 6 to, the Magistrates' Courts Act 1952.

Preamble
The preamble was repealed by section 1 of, and Part I of the Schedule to, the Statute Law Revision Act 1898.

Section 2
This section was repealed by section 1 of, and Part I of the Schedule to, the Statute Law Revision Act 1898.

Section 3
This section, to "enacted that", was repealed by section 1 of, and Part I of the Schedule to, the Statute Law Revision Act 1898.

Section 4
This section, from "and (3) This repeal" to "not passed, was repealed by section 1 of, and Part I of the Schedule to, the Statute Law Revision Act 1898.

The expression "conviction or order of a court of summary jurisdiction" referred to in section 4(2) appears in the entries in the Schedule relating to section 17 of the Parish Apprentices Act 1816 (56 Geo 3 c 139), section 87 of 4 Geo 4 c 95, section 105 of the Highway Act 1835 (5 & 6 Will 4 c 50) and section 269 of the Public Health Act 1875 (38 & 39 Vict c 55) which were repealed so far as they related to an appeal against a conviction or order of a court of summary jurisdiction.

Section 5
This section, to "enacted that", and from "And for the further" to "declared that", was repealed by section 1 of, and Part I of the Schedule to, the Statute Law Revision Act 1898.

Section 7
This section was repealed by section 41 of, and the Schedule to, the Interpretation Act 1889.

Section 8
This section, to "declared that" (occurring first), and from "and for the" to "declared that", was repealed by section 1 of, and Part I of the Schedule to, the Statute Law Revision Act 1898.

Section 10
Section 10 provided that nothing in this Act was to alter the procedure for the recovery of or any remedy for the nonpayment of any poor rate. Section 2(3) of the Rating and Valuation Act 1925 provided that all enactments relating to the poor rate which were in force at the commencement of that Act, including (subject to the provisions of that Act) enactments relating to repeals against a poor rate, were, so far as not repealed by that Act, to apply to the general rate.

Section 11
This section was repealed by section 245(1) of, and Schedule 11 to, the Poor Law Act 1927.

Section 12
This section, to "enacted that", was repealed by section 1 of, and Part I of the Schedule to, the Statute Law Revision Act 1898.

Schedule
The Schedule was repealed by section 1 of, and Part I of the Schedule to, the Statute Law Revision Act 1898.

References
Halsbury's Statutes,
The Public General Statutes passed in the Forty-Seventh and Forty-Eighth Years of the Reign of Her Majesty Queen Victoria, 1884. Printed by Eyre and Spottiswoode, printers to the Queen's Most Excellent Majesty. East Harding Street, London. 1884. Pages 76 to 99.
The Statutes Revised. Third Edition. HMSO. 1950. Volume XI. Pages iii and 26 and 27.

United Kingdom Acts of Parliament 1884